Cantagalli may refer to:
 34718 Cantagalli, a minor planet
 Giovanni Cantagalli (1914–2008), Italian hammer thrower 
 Luca Cantagalli (born 1965), Italian volleyball player
 Ulisse Cantagalli (1839–1901), Italian pottery producer in Florence, Italy